Quasisimnia is a genus of sea snails, marine gastropod mollusks in the family Ovulidae.

Species
Species within the genus Quasisimnia include:

Quasisimnia hirasei (Pilsbry, 1913)
Quasisimnia robertsoni (Cate, 1973)

References

Ovulidae